The 2011 Glastonbury Festival of Contemporary Performing Arts was held from 22–26 June 2011.  Tickets for the festival went on sale from 9 am on Sunday 3 October 2010, over 37 weeks before the festival was set to begin, with a deposit of £50 being paid, while the whole cost of a ticket is £195 (+£5 booking fee and postage and packaging).

It was the last regular edition of Glastonbury until 2013, to make way for the 2012 Summer Olympics and 2012 Summer Paralympics.

Ticket sales
Half the tickets were sold within the first 2 hours and a quarter of the tickets still available by 12pm  despite issues with people purchasing tickets. Tickets sold out in 4 hours.

On 15 February, Coldplay were announced the Saturday night headliner on the Pyramid Stage. Later on the same day, Emily Eavis confirmed that Beyoncé would headline on the Sunday evening. U2 were announced on 24 February as the Friday evening headliners.

Line-up
Headline acts on the Pyramid Stage were U2, Coldplay and Beyoncé, performing on the Friday, Saturday and Sunday respectively; with Beyoncé as Glastonbury's premier finale for 2011.

BBC Introducing stage
The BBC curate a stage at Glastonbury each year showcasing new talent.  This year saw performances from Ed Sheeran, F-Block, The Good Natured, Jake Bugg, Sharks Took the Rest, Vessels and George Ezra, amongst others.

Spirit of '71 stage (Anniversary Pyramid Stage) 
Andrew Kerr, who with Arabella Churchill, put on the 1971 Glastonbury Fayre, curated a "Sprit of '71" Anniversary Pyramid Stage in celebration of the 40th anniversary of the 1971 festival. The Edgar Broughton Band, Mike Oldfield, Steve Hillage, Arthur Brown, Nick Lowe, Noel Harrison, Nik Turner,Nigel Mazlyn Jones and Mick Farren all appeared.

Secret gigs
Secret gigs on the Park Stage saw Radiohead (Friday) and Pulp (Saturday) perform to large crowds.

Weather
The gates opened on Wednesday to rain and heavy showers persisted making the car parks and the festival site a muddy terrain. Dry conditions on the Friday soon made way for yet more rain early afternoon and didn't stop until the Saturday lunchtime.  Sunday was non stop sunshine which dried out the site.

Records
The 2011 festival also broke two television viewing records. Firstly, 18.6 million viewers tuned in from their own homes throughout the festival. A new record for the BBC. Ratings declined by over 1 million from the 2009 to 2010 festival due to the Fifa World Cup and hot weather. The 2011 Festival saw "plenty of rain and a very muddy Glastonbury", causing ratings to climb over 3 million views from the 2010 to 2011 festival.

Also, headliner Beyoncé's performance, which acted as the finale act to the festival, generated over 2.6 million views individually, breaking the record for most television views for a single performance according to the BBC.

References

External links

Official website
Fan website
BBC Glastonbury Festival coverage

2011 in British music
2011 in England
2010s in Somerset
2011
June 2011 events in the United Kingdom